The term Two Solitudes may refer to:

 Two Solitudes (novel), a 1945 novel by Hugh MacLennan
Two Solitudes Derby (aka Canadian Classique and 401 Derby), soccer rivalry between clubs Toronto FC and CF Montréal, named after the novel
Two Solitudes (film), 1978 motion picture written and directed by Lionel Chetwynd, based on the 1945 novel
Two Solitudes (Canadian society), the relationship between English-speaking and French-speaking Canadians
 "Two Solitudes" (short story), a 1995 email story by Carl Steadman
 "Two Solitudes", a 1987 song by Level 42 on their album Running in the Family